The women's pole vault event at the 2010 World Junior Championships in Athletics was held in Moncton, New Brunswick, Canada, at Moncton Stadium on 23 and 24 July.

Medalists

Results

Final
24 July

Qualifications
23 July

Group A

Group B

Participation
According to an unofficial count, 21 athletes from 17 countries participated in the event.

References

Pole vault
Pole vault at the World Athletics U20 Championships
2010 in women's athletics